Deas or DEAS may refer to:

 Deas (surname), a Scottish surname originating in Fife
 Deas Island, a river island in British Columbia, Canada
 Deas Vail, an American rock band
 Department of East Asian Studies, University of Delhi
 Division of Engineering and Applied Sciences, former name of the Harvard School of Engineering and Applied Sciences

See also
 I-DEAS, a computer-aided design software package
 
 Dea (disambiguation)